All at Sea is a British children's television sitcom set in a bed and breakfast. The series began airing on CBBC in 2013. It stars Nicola Stephenson, Steve Edge, Ryan Wilkinson, Olivia Cosgrove and Sam Hattersley amongst others. It is filmed on location in Scarborough and various locations around South Manchester (principally Stockport) and at studios in Manchester. The house filmed is located in Bowdon, Altricham. A second series began airing in September 2014. The series was nominated for the 2014 Kids' BAFTA awards for Best Comedy. It was nominated again in 2015 for the same award. "Santa" was the final episode. Repeats of the show began airing on 1 May 2019 at 17:00 on the CBBC Channel.

Plot
The series revolves around the chaotic misadventures of the Enright family, who have recently moved to Scarborough to run a bed-and-breakfast by the sea. Their middle child and eldest son, Charlie, is a deceptive and mischievous troublemaker, who is constantly plotting schemes to achieve his goal with his best friends, the equally-troublesome Alison and the moralled and more sensible Ben. Charlie's parents, Kevin and Helen, run the dysfunctional bed-and-breakfast and usually try to improve it in different ways, while his vain, rude older sister Hannah is often trying to achieve a goal too, and his eccentric, gullible younger brother Louie believing a tale that will traumatize him and will try to conquer it. Each episode ends with Charlie complaining about his punishment by uttering his catchphrase – "It's a travesty of justice!" The only episodes that didn't end with this is the Series 1 Christmas special "Murderer" and the 2015 Christmas special "Santa". Although filmed with all the Series 2 episodes in the summer of 2014, "Santa" did not actually air until 2015, therefore not being part of Series 2. It was the final episode.

Repeats stopped airing in June 2017 but returned in May 2019. In September 2019 a boxset of the entire first series was made available on BBC iPlayer, and the second series became available in October 2019. Repeats continue to air regularly on CBBC.

Main cast

Episodes

Series 1 (2013)

Series 2 (2014)

Christmas Special (2015)

Notes

References

External links
 

2010s British children's television series
2010s British sitcoms
2013 British television series debuts
2015 British television series endings
BBC television sitcoms
CBBC shows
BBC children's television shows
Scarborough, North Yorkshire
Television shows set in Yorkshire
English-language television shows